Managed by Kingfisher Country Park, Shard End Lake is a man-made lake created out of an old quarry. Located in picturesque Birmingham, this lake holds a variety of silverfish including roach to 1 lb, perch to 2 lbs, bream and tench to 6 lbs, and carp and pike to 30 lbs.

Geography of Birmingham, West Midlands
Tourist attractions in Birmingham, West Midlands
Lakes of the West Midlands (county)